Bronco is a Western series on ABC from 1958 through 1962.  It was shown by the BBC in the United Kingdom.  The program starred Ty Hardin as Bronco Layne, a former Confederate officer who wandered the Old West, meeting such well-known individuals as Wild Bill Hickok, Billy the Kid, Jesse James, Theodore Roosevelt, Belle Starr, Cole Younger, and John Wesley Hardin.

Overview
Bronco premiered in the fall of 1958 when Warner Bros. executives and actor Clint Walker clashed over Walker's contract on the series Cheyenne.  Walker had walked out on his show over such stringent clauses as a requirement that he return half of all personal appearance fees to Warner Bros., and that he only record for Warner music labels.  When the two sides came to an impasse, the network hired newcomer Ty Hardin to play the new character of Bronco Layne, but kept the title of Cheyenne.

When Walker came back to his series, Bronco became a spin-off of Cheyenne. Bronco at first alternated with another Western series, Sugarfoot, featuring Will Hutchins.  In 1960, the two began alternating with Cheyenne under the Cheyenne title. Sugarfoot was dropped in 1961, leaving only Bronco and Cheyenne to alternate.  Other Warner Bros. Westerns in production around this time included Maverick with James Garner, Jack Kelly, and Roger Moore, Colt .45 with Wayde Preston, and Lawman with John Russell; series characters occasionally crossed over into each other's series.

According to the theme song, Bronco came from the Texas Panhandle, but episodes of the series are set throughout the West.

In the eighth episode, "Freeze-Out" (December 30, 1958), a writer calling herself Mary Brown, played by Grace Raynor, hires Bronco to escort her to a ghost town in the high country, where they encounter three men amid the isolation. As it develops, Mary is not interested so much in story ideas, but in the body of a man buried in a nearby glacier and missing gold. Some four years before the debut of his The Virginian, James Drury plays the part of John Smith, who develops a romantic interest in Mary. Edgar Stehli (1884–1973) plays the part of "Pancake" Riddle.

Guest stars
Peter Breck was Theodore Roosevelt in "Yankee Tornado" (1961).
Ahna Capri appeared as the child Emily in "A Town That Lived and Died" (1962).
Russ Conway appeared as Willis Turner, with Chris Alcaide as Brutus Traxel, in "The Silent Witness" (1959).
Walter Coy was Sheriff Walters in "The Turning Point" (1958),  Victor Leggett in "Backfire" (1959), and Sheriff Springer in "Beginner's Luck" (1962).
Francis De Sales was Lawrence Larson in "Hero of the Town" (1959).
Med Flory appeared as Vance Pelham in "Then the Mountains" (1962).
Dean Fredericks was Great Wolf in "Seminole War Pipe" (1960).
Tod Griffin was Sheriff Garth Nelson in "The Silent Witness" (1959) and Chip Garnes in "Volunteers from Aberdeen" (1960).
Rodolfo Hoyos, Jr. portrayed Manuel Figueres in "Flight from an Empire" (1959).
I. Stanford Jolley was Stover in "Brand of Courage" (1958) and Old Man Shirley in "Shadow of Jesse James" (1960).
Douglas Kennedy as Paul Duquesne in "Four Guns and a Prayer" (1958)
Scott Marlowe appeared as John Wesley Hardin in "The Turning Point" (1958). 
Gregg Palmer was Colton in "Destinies West" (1962).
Judson Pratt was Marlow in "Manitoba Manhunt" (1961).
Pernell Roberts appeared as Reverend Dave Clayton in "The Belles of Silver Flats" (1959).
Randy Stuart was Claire Russo in "Tangled Trail" (1960).
Olive Sturgess was Virginia Munger in "Guns of the Lawless" (1961).
Gary Vinson appeared four times in different roles between 1958 and 1961: "Four Guns and a Prayer", "The Devil's Spawn" (as Bud Donner), "The Invaders", and "Cousin from Atlanta".
Tony Young appeared twice, as Cpl. Red Bird in "The Burning Springs" (1959) and as Tod Chapman in "One Evening in Abilene" (1962).
Jack Nicholson appeared as the young lover Bob in the episode "The Equalizer" in season four, episode four (1961). Jack Elam played Mr. Thompson in the same episode.

Episodes

Series overview

Season 1 (1958–59)

Season 2 (1959–60)

Season 3 (1960–61)

Season 4 (1961–62)

Release

Home media 
Warner Bros. has released the first three seasons on DVD in Region 1 via their Warner Archive Collection.  These are manufacture-on-demand (MOD) releases, available through Warner's online store and Amazon.com. The fourth and final season was released on May 19, 2015.

References

External links

 
 
 Bronco at CVTA

1950s Western (genre) television series
1958 American television series debuts
1962 American television series endings
American Broadcasting Company original programming
Television series by Warner Bros. Television Studios
Black-and-white American television shows
English-language television shows
1960s Western (genre) television series